AmBisyon Natin 2040 (literally "Our Ambition 2040") is the twenty-five-year long term vision developed by the Philippine government as a guide for development planning.  It is designed to overcome the challenges brought by the Philippines' current political system, which is bound to the limits of the country's six-year presidential terms.

Conceived by the senior government officials before the 2016 Philippine presidential election, it was picked up by the Duterte administration and put into force by Executive Order No. 5, series of 2016.

See also 
 DuterteNomics

References 

Government of the Philippines
Philipines